Maria Musoke, sometimes referred to as Maria G.N. Musoke (born 19 January 1955) is a Ugandan information scientist and academic. She is the first Ugandan woman to obtain a PhD in Information Science. She is a professor of Information Science and a Deputy Vice Chancellor (May 2018–) at Kyambogo University in Uganda. She also serves as a council member (2019–2022) of the Uganda National Academy of Sciences.

Early life and education 
Musoke was born on 19 January 1955 in Masaka District, Central Uganda. She attended Trinity College Nabbingo for her Ordinary level Certificate and Advanced level classes (S1-S6). She then entered Makerere University in 1974, to study botany, Zoology and Education, graduating with the Bachelor of Science degree and Diploma in Education in 1978. She later obtained a Post Graduate Diploma in Librarianship in 1980 after which she pursued a Master of Librarianship and Information Science, specializing in health information at the University of Wales, Great Britain. In 2001, she graduated from the University of Sheffield, becoming the first woman in Uganda to acquire a PhD in Information science.

Professional career 
Musoke was a librarian at the Albert Cook Medical Library at Makerere University prior to becoming the University Librarian of Makerere University Library from 2004 to 2014. She would then become the first female professor of information science in 2010. She later joined the East African School of Library and Information Science at Makerere University in 2015. In May 2018, she was appointed Deputy Vice-Chancellor in charge of Academic Affairs at Kyambogo University. She was  appointed alongside Associate Prof. Annabella Habinka Basaza  of Mbarara University  and Prof. John Robert Tabuti as Government representatives to Busitema University Senate. She has authored several publications.

Musoke received an Honorary Fellowship award in 2018 from the Chartered Institute of Library and Information Professionals (CILIP) in recognition of her contribution to the Library and Information Science profession. She is a Standing Committee member of Health and Biosciences Libraries Section of the International Federation of Library Associations and Institutions (IFLA) (2011–), a member of the International Working Committee on Big data in Open data world (2015–) and an Advisory Council member for Research4Life in 2013.

Publications

References

External links 
 

1955 births
Living people
Information scientists
Academic staff of Kyambogo University
People from Masaka District
Makerere University alumni
Alumni of the University of Wales
Alumni of the University of Sheffield
Academic staff of Makerere University
Academic librarians
21st-century Ugandan women scientists
21st-century Ugandan scientists